Temple of Art is a documentary film created and directed by Allan Amato and Olga Nunes. The film follows over 50 artists' creative process and philosophies, asking each of them the question, “Why do you make art?”.

The  artists and musicians include: Grant Morrison, Bill Sienkiewicz, Brian Thies, Barron Storey, Amanda Palmer, Neil Gaiman, Olga Nunes, David Mack, Dave McKean and others, each sharing their stories of their creations, influences and philosophies.

The film provides a look at the industry of art as it continues to change and evolve.

Temple of Art has been slated for international distribution on DVD.

References

External links

 
 
 Comic-Con 2014: 10 Must-See Comic Panels
 Drawn and Drafted Productions

Documentary films about the arts
2018 documentary films
American documentary films
2018 films
2010s English-language films
2010s American films